Dorothy Michaelis Theomin (1888–1966) was a notable New Zealand philanthropist and mountaineer. She was born in Dunedin, New Zealand in 1888 as daughter of David Theomin.

References

1888 births
1966 deaths
New Zealand philanthropists
New Zealand mountain climbers
Sportspeople from Dunedin
Female climbers
Hallenstein family
Burials at Dunedin Southern Cemetery
20th-century philanthropists